Henri Alwies Airstrip , also known as Henri Alwies Airfield or Henri Alwies Vliegveld, is in the Saramacca district of Suriname. This is one of the newest airports in Suriname, in use since April 5, 2012.

It is the homebase of the crop dusting company ERK Farms, and is also heavily used by the Gliders Club Zweefvliegclub Akka.

History
On March 24, 2013, an Open Day was held at the new Henri Alwies Airfield with multiple planes from Zorg en Hoop Airport and a demonstration from Skydive Free 2 Fly Suriname jumping parachutes from a privately owned Britten-Norman BN-2 Islander (N26NB). Surinamese Minister Of Sport & Youth, Ismanto Adna, participated with a tandem parachute jump. A crop dusting demonstration was performed by pilot Martin Veldkamp with a Grumman G-164B Ag-Cat B (PZ-USB) from ERK Farms.

Charters and destinations 
Charter airlines serving this airport are:

See also

 List of airports in Suriname
 Transport in Suriname

References

External links
OpenStreetMap - Alwies Airstrip

Airports in Suriname
Saramacca District